Madavareddy  Padma Devender Reddy (born 6 January 1969) is an Indian politician who was the 1st Deputy Speaker of Telangana Legislative Assembly from 12 June 2014 to 16 January 2019 and Member of the Telangana Legislative Assembly from Medak constituency from 2 June 2014. She belongs to the Telangana Rashtra Samithi. She is a former MLA from Ramayampet assembly constituency. She regularly appears on political debates on Television and is known for good oratory skills.

Early life
Padma Devender Reddy was born in Namapur, Karimnagar, Telangana, India. She did her schooling at Vaniniketan Paatashaala, Karimnagar and did her BA and LLB.

Career
She was a practising advocate in the Ranga Reddy district court and Andhra Pradesh High Court before entering active politics. She actively participated in the Telangana movement and entered politics after the TRS was formed in 2001.

Political career
Padma Devender Reddy joined at the inception in April 2001. She was elected as ZPTC Member from Ramayampet to Medak Zilla Parishad in 2001 local body elections and served as floor leader of the TRS party. After the formation of TRS party, she won with a large margin of 12,000 votes.

She was an MLA from 2004–09 from the same constituency. She lost the election in 2009 general elections.

She was suspended from the TRS party in 2009 and contested as a rebel. She joined TRS again in 2010. She won again as MLA in 2014 General elections from Medak assembly constituency defeating actress, Vijayashanti.

Deputy Speaker
On 12 June 2014, Padma Devender Reddy was elected unanimously as Deputy Speaker of the Telangana State Legislative Assembly, becoming the First Deputy Speaker in the newly created state of Telangana.

References

Telangana Rashtra Samithi politicians
Telangana MLAs 2014–2018
Women in Telangana politics
People from Karimnagar
Living people
1969 births
Deputy Speakers of the Telangana Legislative Assembly
People from Medak district
Telangana district councillors
21st-century Indian women politicians
21st-century Indian politicians
Telangana MLAs 2018–2023